George William Martens (1874 – 23 August 1949) was an Australian politician. He was an Australian Labor Party member of the Australian House of Representatives from 1928 to 1946, representing the electorate of Herbert.

Early life 
Born in Mount Perry, Queensland, he received a primary education before becoming a bushworker. Martens gained work at the Pleystowe Sugar Mill, west of Mackay in northern Queensland, where two of his co-workers were future Prime Minister Arthur Fadden and Queensland state politician Maurice Hynes.

Politics 
Martens was active in the trade union movement, notably the Sugar Workers Union, and was an organiser with the Australian Workers' Union, of which he eventually became Queensland secretary. In 1928, he was elected to the Australian House of Representatives as the Labor member for Herbert, defeating the sitting Nationalist Lewis Nott. He held the seat until 1946, when he retired from politics.

Later life 
After retiring from politics, Martens become director of Commonwealth Oil Refineries. Martens died on 23 August 1949 in Sydney, New South Wales. His death bed request was that there would be no newspaper nor radio announcements of his death and that he should be cremated quietly and privately.

Sources
 Arklay, T.M. (2016) Arthur Fadden: A Political Silhouette, Australian Scholarly Publishing: North Melbourne. .

References

External links 

  — obituary

Australian Labor Party members of the Parliament of Australia
Members of the Australian House of Representatives for Herbert
Members of the Australian House of Representatives
1874 births
1946 deaths
People from North Queensland
20th-century Australian politicians